Following is a list of senators of Bas-Rhin, people who have represented the department of Bas-Rhin in the Senate of France.
Bas-Rhin was annexed by Germany in 1871 after the Franco-Prussian War, and was returned to France in 1919 by the Treaty of Versailles.
Therefore the first senators of Bas-Rhin took their seats in 1920.

Third Republic

Senators for Bas-Rhin under the French Third Republic were:

Fourth Republic

Senators for Bas-Rhin under the French Fourth Republic were:

Fifth Republic 
Senators for Bas-Rhin under the French Fifth Republic:

References

Sources

 
Lists of members of the Senate (France) by department